Tolna niveipicta  is a species of moth of the family Erebidae first described by Embrik Strand in 1915.

It is found in Cameroon and the Democratic Republic of the Congo.

This species has a wingspan of 48 mm and a body length of 21 mm.

References

Erebinae